Prince Ali Salman Aga Khan (13 June 1911 – 12 May 1960), known as Aly Khan, was a Pakistani diplomat of Iranian and Italian descent. He was the son of the Aga Khan III, and the father of Aga Khan IV.

A socialite, racehorse owner and jockey, he was the third husband of actress Rita Hayworth. After being passed over for succession as Aga Khan, he served as the Permanent Representative of Pakistan to the United Nations from 1958 to 1960, where he became a vice president of the General Assembly.

His first name was typically spelled "Aly" in the press. The titles of prince and princess, which are claimed by children of the Aga Khan by virtue of their descent from the Qajar king Fath Ali Shah of the Persian Qajar dynasty, were recognized as courtesy titles by the British government in 1938.

Birth and education

Aly Khan was born in Turin, Italy, the younger son and only surviving child of the Aga Khan III and Cleope Teresa "Ginetta" Magliano. His father was born in Karachi, British India (now in modern-day Pakistan). His mother was Italian. His paternal grandparents were born in Iran. He had two brothers: Prince Giuseppe Mahdi Aga Khan (who died in 1911) and, by his father's third marriage, Sadruddin Aga Khan. Aly Khan was educated by private tutors in India and France during his childhood. He later trained in England as a lawyer. As a 12-year-old boy, he knew  Orson Welles. Years later, both of them were husbands of Rita Hayworth.

Military service and honours
In 1939, Prince Aly Aga Khan joined the French Foreign Legion and served with its cavalry division in Egypt and the Middle East. In 1940, he joined the Royal Wiltshire Yeomanry, becoming a lieutenant colonel in 1944. That same year, he participated in the Allied landing in the south of France with the United States Seventh Army, serving as a liaison officer with the rank of captain; for this, he was made an officer in the Legion of Honour in 1950.

He also was awarded the Croix de Guerre and the United States Bronze Star Medal.

Prince Aly Khan was installed as the 1st Colonel of the Regiment of the newly raised 4 Cavalry Regiment (1 November 1956), Pakistani Army in a military ceremony during 1957 and he retained this honor until his death.

Ambassador of Pakistan to the United Nations
In November 1957 Aly Khan met President Iskander Mirza of Pakistan and was offered a post as the country's Ambassador to the United Nations. The formal announcement of the appointment was made on 6 February 1958.

As a member of the United Nations Political and Security Committee representing Pakistan, Aly Khan's brief U.N. posting was viewed with surprise by many observers, some of whom considered him "the Asian-African answer to Irene Dunne", an American movie star not known for her political skills, Dunne had recently been designated a member of the United States delegation at General Assembly, largely in recognition of her Republican fundraising efforts.

He was elected as vice president of the United Nations General Assembly on 17 September 1958 and also served as chairman of the U.N.'s Peace Observation Committee.

Personal life
Prince Aly Khan was famously a man-about-town in his youth. "I had been involved with several women", he gamely told a reporter when asked about his life. His list of affairs included high-profile lovers such as the British debutante Margaret Whigham, later Duchess of Argyll, Thelma, Viscountess Furness, an American who was simultaneously involved with the Prince of Wales, British entertainer Joyce Grenfell and British socialite and hostess Pat Marlowe. Of his first wife, he remarked, "I was tired of trouble. Joan was a sane and solid girl, and I thought if I married her, I would stay out of trouble."

First marriage
Aly Khan was named co-respondent in the Guinness v Guinness and Khan divorce suit between Joan Barbara Guinness (née Yarde-Buller, 1908–1997; daughter of John Reginald Lopes Yarde-Buller, 3rd Baron Churston), and Group Captain Thomas Loel Guinness MP, a scion of the Guinness Brewery family. In 1935, Guinness sued for divorce, naming Aly Khan as the "third party", he cited as evidence that his wife and Aly Khan had occupied a hotel room together from 17 May until 20 May 1935, and that his wife had told him that she "had formed an attachment for (Aly Khan) and desired her husband to divorce her". The case was uncontested, and Aly Khan was ordered to pay all costs.

Aly Khan and Joan Barbara Guinness were married in Paris on 18 May 1936, a few days after Joan Guinness's divorce became absolute. Before the wedding, the bride converted to Islam and took the name Taj-ud-dawlah or "crown of the realm". The couple's first child, Prince Karim, was born in Geneva seven months later, on 13 December 1936, and is said to have been a premature child. The couple also had a second son, Prince Amyn Muhammad Aga Khan, who was also born premature at seven months the following year. Joan Barbara also had a son by her previous marriage, Patrick Guinness.

Aly Khan and Joan Barbara were divorced in 1949, in part due to his extramarital affairs with, among others, Pamela Churchill. After the divorce, Joan Barbara became the longtime mistress and eventual wife of the newspaper magnate Seymour Berry, 2nd Viscount Camrose. Aly Khan married American actress Rita Hayworth within weeks of his divorce.

Second marriage and divorce

On 27 May (civil) and 28 May (religious) 1949, in Cannes, France, Aly Khan married American film star Rita Hayworth, who left her film career to marry him.

Aly Khan and his family were heavily involved in horse racing, owning and racing horses. Hayworth had no interest in the sport, but became a member of the Del Mar Thoroughbred Club anyway. Her filly, Double Rose, won several races in France and finished second in the 1949 Prix de l'Arc de Triomphe.

In 1951, while still married to Hayworth, Khan was spotted dancing with the actress Joan Fontaine in the nightclub where he and his wife had met. Hayworth threatened to divorce him in Reno, Nevada, US. In early May, Hayworth moved to Nevada to establish legal residence to qualify for a divorce. She stayed at Lake Tahoe, Nevada with their daughter, saying there was a threat the child would be kidnapped. Hayworth filed for divorce from Khan on 2 September 1951, on the grounds of "extreme cruelty, entirely mental in nature."

Hayworth once said she might convert to Islam, but did not. During the custody fight over their daughter, Princess Yasmin Aga Khan, born , the Prince said he wanted her raised as a Muslim; Hayworth (who had been raised a Roman Catholic) wanted the child to be a Christian.

Aly Khan and Rita Hayworth divorced in 1953. Hayworth rejected his offer of $1,000,000 if she would raise Yasmin in the Muslim faith from age seven and allow her to go to Europe to visit with him for two or three months each year.
"Nothing will make me give up Yasmin's chance to live here in America among our precious freedoms and habits," declared Hayworth. "While I respect the Muslim faith and all other faiths it is my earnest wish that my daughter be raised as a normal, healthy American girl in the Christian faith. There isn't any amount of money in the entire world for which it is worth sacrificing this child's privilege of living as a normal Christian girl here in the United States. There just isn't anything else in the world that can compare with her sacred chance to do that. And I'm going to give it to Yasmin regardless of what it costs."

Engagement
While still married to Rita Hayworth, Khan began a relationship with American film and stage actress Gene Tierney, whom he was engaged to marry in 1952; while Gene mentioned their engagement a few times, it was never formally announced. His father, however, strongly opposed the union with another Hollywood actress. After a year-long engagement, Tierney separated from the Prince and moved back to the United States to tend to her mental health. In the late 1950s Aly was known to start dating the fashion model Simone Micheline Bodin (who called herself Bettina Graziani). She was persuaded by Prince Aly Khan to retire from modelling and settle down. By the 1960s Bettina and the Prince were engaged and expecting a child, whom she miscarried after being in a car accident.

Inheritance Skips a Generation
On 12 July 1957, upon the reading of the will of the Aga Khan III, Aly Khan's eldest son, Karim Aga Khan, then a junior at Harvard University, was named Aga Khan IV and 49th Imam of the Ismailis. It was the first time that the descent from father to son was circumvented in the community's 1,300-year history. According to the Aga Khan's will, a statement of which was presented to the press by his secretary:
"In view of the fundamentally altered conditions in the world in very recent years due to the great changes that have taken place, including the discoveries of atomic science, I am convinced that it is in the best interests of the Shia Muslim Ismaili community that I should be succeeded by a young man who has been brought up and developed during recent years and in the midst of the new age, and who brings a new outlook on life to his office."

Racehorse owner and breeder

Prince Aly Khan was a famous owner and breeder of racehorses in France, England and Ireland. Noel Murless the Champion Trainer on multiple occasions in England told his biographer 'Apart from his immense charm, Prince Aly was also highly intelligent, a first-class judge of a horse and of form and breeding. It is probably fair to say that, with his experience of international racing, he was the best judge of collateral form in the world, and his flair for pedigrees was unique.

Aga Khan III was a prominent Racehorse owner and breeder. After the second world war, Aly Khan bought a half share in his father's racing interests. Early success for the partnership led to them heading the list of winning breeders from 1947 to 1949 and 1952.

Death 

On 12 May 1960, a little more than two years after his appointment as Pakistan's Ambassador to the UN, Aly Khan sustained catastrophic head injuries in an automobile accident in Suresnes, France, a suburb of Paris, when the car he was driving collided with another vehicle at the intersection of boulevard Henri Sellier and rue du Mont Valerien, while he and his pregnant fiancée, Bettina, were heading to a party. He died shortly afterward at Foch Hospital (in Suresnes). Bettina survived with a minor injury to her forehead, though the shock of the accident would result in a miscarriage. The prince's chauffeur, who was in the back seat, also survived, as did the driver of the oncoming car.

Aly Khan was buried on the grounds of Château de l'Horizon, his home in the south of France, where it was intended that he would remain until a mausoleum was built for him in Syria. His remains were removed to Damascus, Syria, on 11 July 1972, and he was reinterred in Salamiyah, Syria.

His fortune went almost entirely to his children. The only beneficiaries of his will outside family and employees were Bettina, who received a $280,000 USD bequest, Lord Astor (one of his closest friends) and Sybilla Szczeniowska (a woman he met initially in Cairo in 1941) and her son Marek who received $14,000 and $56,000 respectively. 

Writing in The Times a few days after his death Lord Astor paid him a tribute. "If one only knew Aly Khan by repute it was easy to preconceive a dislike towards him. When one met him it was impossible not to be stimulated and attracted by his charm, his perfect manners, his vitality, his gaiety and sense of fun. But if you were fortunate enough to know him really well, and have him as a friend, you acquired a friendship which was incomparable - generous, imaginative, enduring and almost passionately warm.

Icon of popular culture 
Due to his well-publicized romances, Prince Aly Khan was mentioned in a verse of Noël Coward's 1950s lyrics for Cole Porter's 1928 song "Let's Do It, Let's Fall in Love": "Monkeys whenever you look do it / Aly Khan and King Farouk do it/Let's do it, let's fall in love."

Lucille P. Markey, owner of Calumet Farm Thoroughbred racing stable in Lexington, Kentucky, named one of her outstanding colts, "Alydar" in his honor because she always addressed the prince as, "Aly Darling".

In the 20 May 2012 episode of Mad Men, Don Draper mentions that he thought Joan Harris was seeing Aly Khan, given the frequency of flower deliveries to her office. Later on in the episode, Joan Harris receives a bouquet of red roses (purportedly from Don Draper) with a note that says "Your mother did a good job - Ali Khan."

In a Honeymooners episode titled "The Golfer", which first aired on 15 October 1955, Alice Kramden — when her husband Ralph needs an excuse to not go golfing with his boss — exclaims, "Sure, you can always tell him you're going tiger hunting with Aly Khan."

See also 
 List of Ismaili imams
 Fatimids
 Isma'ilism
 Nizari
 Aga Khan

References
Inline

General
 Bettina (1965). Bettina by Bettina. London: Michael Joseph. .
 Edwards, Anne (1996). Throne of Gold: The Lives of the Aga Khans. New York: William Morrow. .
 Slater, Leonard (1965). Aly: A Biography. New York: Random House. .
 Tierney, Gene; Herskowitz, Mickey (1979). Self-Portrait. New York: Peter Wyden Books. .
 Young, Gordon (1955). Golden Prince: The Remarkable Life of Prince Aly Khan. London: R. Hale. .

External links
A Film on the Aga Khan which covers Aly Khan and the previous Aga Khan 
Aly Khan Presents Credentials 1958

1911 births
1960 deaths
British Army personnel of World War II
British Ismailis
British jockeys
British people of Iranian descent
British people of Italian descent
British people of Pakistani descent
Pakistani people of Iranian descent
Pakistani people of Italian descent
British racehorse owners and breeders
British socialites
Officiers of the Légion d'honneur
Nobility from Turin
Permanent Representatives of Pakistan to the United Nations
Princes
Qajar dynasty
Recipients of the Croix de Guerre 1939–1945 (France)
Road incident deaths in France
Royal Wiltshire Yeomanry officers
Soldiers of the French Foreign Legion
British officials of the United Nations
Owners of Prix de l'Arc de Triomphe winners
British people of Arab descent
Noorani family